Beauty & Ruin is the 11th solo album from former Hüsker Dü and Sugar frontman Bob Mould. It is his highest-charting solo album, peaking at #38 on the US Billboard 200.

Track listing

Personnel
Bob Mould - guitars, vocals, keyboards, photography, producer
Jason Narducy - bass
Jon Wurster - drums

Critical reception

Upon its release, Beauty & Ruin was met with positive reviews. At Metacritic, which assigns a weighted mean rating out of 100 to reviews from mainstream critics, the album received an average score of 76, which indicates "generally favourable reviews."

Charts

References

2014 albums
Bob Mould albums
Albums produced by Bob Mould
Merge Records albums